Chimera is a 1968 Italian "musicarello" film directed by Ettore Maria Fizzarotti. The title is a reference to the Gianni Morandi's eponymous hit song.

Cast 
 Gianni Morandi: Gianni Raimondi 
 Laura Efrikian: Laura Raimondi 
 Nino Taranto: José Da Costa 
 Katia Moguy: Maria Da Costa 
 Clelia Matania: Lina, the maid
 Franco Giacobini:  the sergeant  
 Lino Toffolo: Sanmarco 
 Carlo Taranto: Roberto Mendoza 
 Tino Bianchi: the professor 
 Enzo Cannavale:  Hotel doorman
 Gino Bramieri: Mr. Krone-Luigi Brambilla 
 Roberto Carlos: Carlos Roberto 
 Pippo Franco:  commilitone

References

External links

1968 films
Musicarelli
1968 musical comedy films
Films directed by Ettore Maria Fizzarotti
Films scored by Gianfranco Reverberi
1960s Italian films
1960s Italian-language films